Karin Lichey Usry is an American gymnast [born , in Cincinnati, Ohio]. She attended the University of Georgia from 1996–1999, and was part of both NCAA Championship teams in 1998 and 1999.  She earned first-team All-America certificates in all five categories both of those years and earned a total of 11 All-America awards in her career.  The Southeastern Conference recognized her as its Freshman of the Year in 1996 and Gymnast of the Year in 1999. She won the Honda Sports Award as the nations's top gymnast in 1999.

On February 23, 1996, during her freshman year, she became the first collegiate gymnast ever to score an extremely rare perfect 40.0 in the all-around. As of 2022, she remains the only collegiate gymnast ever to accomplish this feat.

Career Perfect 10.0 

After graduating from college with a Bachelor of Science in Education in 2000, she married Mike Usry and had two children.  She has been a volunteer coach for the University of Georgia women's gymnastics team. She now works in the Division of Development & Alumni Relations at the University of Georgia as the Director of Board Relations at the University of Georgia Foundation and Director of the Emeriti Trustees and the Board of Visitors.

References

American female artistic gymnasts
Living people
1977 births
Sportspeople from Cincinnati
Gymnasts from Ohio
21st-century American women
NCAA gymnasts who have scored a perfect 10
Georgia Gym Dogs gymnasts